The Wibault 10/II Tramontane was a two-seat reconnaissance aircraft designed and built by Société des Avions Michel Wibault in France for the French military 1923 A.2 competition for a 2-seater reconnaissance aircraft.

Design and development
Derived from the Wibault 9, the Wib 10/II, (the Wibault 10 designation was re-used from an unbuilt project), was a parasol monoplane with two cockpits in tandem to house the pilot and observer. As with previous Wibault aircraft the Wib 10/II was built entirely from Duralumin with corrugated sheet skin and a strut-braced parasol wing.

Power was supplied by a  Gnome & Rhône 9Ac 9-cyl. air-cooled radial engine with a crankcase cowl leaving just the cylinders exposed. Pilot and observer were housed in tandem cockpits with fixed armament of 2x  Vickers machine guns, synchronised to fire through the propeller, mounted in the forward fuselage and 2x  Lewis machine guns on a manually aimed mount in the rear cockpit.

Specifications

References

Wibault aircraft
1920s French military reconnaissance aircraft
Single-engined tractor aircraft
Parasol-wing aircraft
Aircraft first flown in 1926